Perpetual Edict may refer to:
The Praetor's Edict in Roman Law, after the praetors began reissuing exactly the same edict as their predecessors, about 130 AD. 
Edict of 1577
Perpetual Edict (1611)
Perpetual Edict (1667)